Yuen Tsuen Ancient Trail, also known as Yuen Tsuen Traditional Footpath, is a trail linking Yuen Long and Tsuen Wan in the New Territories of Hong Kong. The trail was the major trail for travelling between two major towns for villages trading their necessaries before the completion of Castle Peak Road.

The trail routes along Tsuen Wan, Tsuen King Circuit, Ha Fa Shan, Shek Lung Kung, Sheung Tong, Tin Fu Tsai, Tai Lam Chung, Nam Hang Pai and Yuen Long.

Leisure
Part of the trail is designated as natural trail for hikers. Starting from Shek Lung Kung, it routes south to Sham Tseng instead of going to Yuen Long.

The starting of the stage 10 of MacLehose Trail meets the Yuen Tsuen Ancient Trail at Tin Fu Tsai, where a campsite is available for campers.

References

Hiking trails in Hong Kong
Tsuen Wan District
Yuen Long District